Ilyophis blachei is an eel in the family Synaphobranchidae (cutthroat eels). It was described by Luiz Vieria Caldas Saldanha and Nigel Merrett in 1982. It is a marine, deep water-dwelling eel which is known from the northeastern and southeastern Atlantic and southern Indian Ocean. It dwells at a depth range , and inhabits the continental shelf.

I. blachei spawns in June and July. Its diet consists primarily of galatheid crustaceans.

References

Synaphobranchidae
Fish described in 1982
Taxa named by Luiz Vieria Caldas Saldanha
Taxa named by Nigel Merrett